"Goodbye Girl" is a song by English pop duo Go West. It was released in 1985 as the third single from their self-titled debut album. The song charted in the UK, Ireland and New Zealand, reaching No. 25 on the UK Singles Chart, No. 19 on the Irish Singles Chart, and No. 33 on the New Zealand chart.

References

Go West (band) songs
1985 singles
Pop ballads
Chrysalis Records singles
Songs written by Peter Cox (musician)
Songs written by Richard Drummie
1985 songs